Dysdera aurgitana is a spider species found in Spain.

See also 
 List of Dysderidae species

References

External links 

Dysderidae
Spiders of Europe
Spiders described in 1996